USS John F. Lehman (DDG-137) is a planned  guided missile destroyer of the United States Navy, the 87th overall for the class. She will honor Philadelphia-born John Lehman, who was the 65th United States Secretary of the Navy during 1981–1987, under the Ronald Reagan administration. During this tenure, he pushed for the creation of a 600-ship Navy.

References

 

Arleigh Burke-class destroyers
Proposed ships of the United States Navy